Yamada Nishiki (Japanese: 山田錦) is a short-grain Japanese rice famous for its use in high-quality sake. It is particularly desired by sake brewers for its ability to absorb water and dissolve easily.

Yamada Nishiki is the most commonly grown sake rice (sakamai). In 1923, Yamada Nishiki was created by crossing Yamadaho and Tankanwataribune. In 1936, the rice was named Yamada Nishiki. This special rice is mainly grown in Hyogo-ken, its original area, but also Okayama-ken and Fukuoka-ken.

See also 
 Japanese rice
 Japanese cuisine
Shōchū

References 

Japonica rice